Soft Swingin' Jazz is an album by trumpeter Joe Newman's Quartet with organist Shirley Scott recorded in early 1958 for the Coral label.

Reception

Allmusic awarded the album 3½ stars stating "a mellow, lovely session unique within the trumpeter's catalog. For starters, Newman assumes vocal duties on a handful of cuts, proving himself a fine crooner. Moreover, the spacious, nuanced arrangements afford him the room to summon some of his most intimate but impassioned solos. Not to mention that Scott's an uncommonly sympathetic collaborator, shaping and underlining the melodies to create rolling, contoured grooves with the texture of velvet.".

Track listing
 "Makin' Whoopee" (Walter Donaldson, Gus Kahn) – 3:18
 "Three Little Words" (Harry Ruby, Bert Kalmar) – 2:38 	
 "Scotty" (Shirley Scott) – 4:28
 "There's a Small Hotel" (Richard Rodgers, Lorenz Hart) – 2:37 	
 "I Let a Song Go Out of My Heart" (Duke Ellington, Irving Mills, Henry Nemo, John Redmond) – 3:19
 "Moonglow" (Will Hudson, Mills, Eddie DeLange) – 3:39 	
 "Organ Grinder's Swing" (Hudson, Mills, Mitchell Parish) – 3:01
 "Rosetta" (Earl Hines, Henri Woode) – 3:35
 "Too Marvelous for Words" (Richard A. Whiting, Johnny Mercer) – 3:07
 "The Farmer's Daughter" (Harold Arlen, Yip Harburg) – 2:59
 "Save Your Love for Me" (Buddy Johnson) – 3:56   
Recorded in New York City on January 13 (tracks 2, 10 & 11), January 15 (tracks 1, 3, 8 & 9) and January 17 (tracks 4–7), 1958

Personnel 
Joe Newman – trumpet, vocals
Shirley Scott – organ
Eddie Jones – bass
Charlie Persip – drums
Ernie Wilkins – piano (track 11)

References 

1958 albums
Coral Records albums
Joe Newman (trumpeter) albums